Maalique Nathanael Foster (born 5 November 1996) is a Jamaican footballer who plays for Colorado Springs Switchbacks in the USL Championship.

Career

Portmore United

Foster played for Portmore United in the Jamaican RPSL, before he signed with Alajuelense. Foster won an RSPL title in the 2017–18 season.

LD Alajuelense

On 1 September 2018, Foster joined Alajuelense in Costa Rica on a season-long loan. Foster scored his first goal for Alajuelense a month later on 28 October.

Rio Grande Valley FC (loan)
On 27 January 2019, Foster joined USL Championship side Rio Grande Valley FC Toros on loan.

Santos de Guápiles (loan)
Foster joined Costa Rican side Santos de Guápiles on loan following the end of his spell at Rio Grande Valley.

Sacramento Republic
On 10 December 2020, Foster moved to USL Championship side Sacramento Republic ahead of their 2021 season. On 28 June 2022, Foster was named USL Championship Player of the Week for Week 16 of the 2022 season, after scoring both goals in a 2-1 victory over Monterey Bay FC.

Colorado Springs Switchbacks
Ahead of the 2023 season, Foster signed with USL Championship side Colorado Springs Switchbacks.

International
Foster, a naturalized American citizen, represents his home country of Jamaica in international football. He played for the Jamaica U17s in 2013 at the CONCACAF final round in Panama.
Foster made his senior team debut on 30 January 2018, in a friendly match against South Korea in Antalya, Turkey. The South Koreans were ahead 2–1 in the game, however, Jamaica pulled level with a distant strike from Maalique Foster, which found the top corner, and scored his inaugural international goal in the 72nd minute of his debut match for Jamaica to end the encounter in a creditable 2–2 draw.

International goals
Scores and results list Jamaica's goal tally first.

Honors

Portmore United F.C.
Jamaica National Premier League: 1
2017–18

References

Jamaican footballers
1996 births
Living people
Jamaica international footballers
Association football midfielders
Portmore United F.C. players
L.D. Alajuelense footballers
Rio Grande Valley FC Toros players
Hapoel Ironi Kiryat Shmona F.C. players
National Premier League players
Liga FPD players
USL Championship players
Israeli Premier League players
Expatriate footballers in Costa Rica
Expatriate soccer players in the United States
Expatriate footballers in Israel
Jamaican expatriate sportspeople in Costa Rica
Jamaican expatriate sportspeople in the United States
Jamaican expatriate sportspeople in Israel
Sacramento Republic FC players
Colorado Springs Switchbacks FC players